Helga Birgitte Salvesen (23 December 1963 – 20 January 2016) was a Norwegian physician and professor of medicine at the University of Bergen.

Salvesen was born in Asker, but moved to Bergen at the age of four. She took the cand.med. degree in 1991 and the dr.med. degree in 2000, with the doctoral thesis Tumor Biomarkers and Prognostic Factors in Endometrial Carcinoma. She became chief physician at Haukeland University Hospital, and in 2003 also professor of gynecology and obstetrics at the University of Bergen. Here, she became co-director of the excellent research centre Centre for Cancer Biomarkers. In 2015 she was elected as a fellow of the Norwegian Academy of Science and Letters.

She was married to fellow physician Pål Rasmus Njølstad since 1986, and had four children, all boys. She died suddenly in January 2016.

References

1963 births
2016 deaths
Norwegian obstetricians and gynaecologists
Norwegian women physicians
University of Bergen alumni
Academic staff of the University of Bergen
Members of the Norwegian Academy of Science and Letters
People from Asker